The 1977 German Grand Prix was a Formula One motor race held at Hockenheimring on 31 July 1977. It was the eleventh race of the 1977 World Championship of F1 Drivers and the 1977 International Cup for F1 Constructors.

The German Grand Prix was moved to Hockenheim following Niki Lauda's accident at the Nürburgring in 1976. This was the second time the race was held at Hockenheim, the first being in 1970.

The 47-lap race was won by Lauda, driving a Ferrari. Jody Scheckter finished second in a Wolf-Ford, having started from pole position, while Hans-Joachim Stuck was third in a Brabham-Alfa Romeo.

During the race, Penske driver Hans Heyer participated despite not qualifying.  Mechanical issues forced Heyer to retire on lap 9, which caused his participation to be discovered.  He was disqualified, making him the only driver to not qualify, not finish and be disqualified in a single race.

Report
In qualifying, Jody Scheckter took his first pole of the season, ahead of John Watson and then Niki Lauda who headed the second row. The start of the race was given by a green flag due to red/green lights being damaged by a service vehicle, which as a result caused an accident near the back of the grid between Alan Jones and Clay Regazzoni (putting both drivers out on the spot). Scheckter kept the lead at the first corner with both Watson and Lauda keeping their positions. Watson put pressure on Scheckter until his engine failed on the eighth lap, giving second to Lauda who passed Scheckter soon after and began to pull away. Scheckter battled for second with James Hunt until the defending champion retired with an engine failure which was caused by a broken fuel pump on lap 33, thus giving third to Watson's teammate and home driver Hans-Joachim Stuck. That was how it stayed to the end; Lauda winning from Scheckter and Stuck, whilst the rest of the points were rounded-out with Lauda's teammate Carlos Reutemann, Vittorio Brambilla in the Surtees and Patrick Tambay in the Ensign. This was the 100th World Championship race victory for tyre manufacturer Goodyear.

Classification

Qualifying classification

Race classification

Championship standings after the race

Drivers' Championship standings

Constructors' Championship standings

References

German Grand Prix
German Grand Prix
German Grand Prix